L'Assomption is an off-island suburb of Montreal, in southwestern Quebec, Canada on the L'Assomption River. It is the seat of the Regional County Municipality of L'Assomption.  It is located on the outer fringes of the Montreal urban area.

Most of the economy depends on the  agricultural industries of the surrounding plains.  It is also the cultural centre of the region.

History

In 1647, the L'Assomption Seignory was granted to Pierre Legardeur de Repentigny, named after the river already named such since the seventeenth century. Between 1640 and 1700, a settlement formed inside a large horseshoe-shaped meander of the L'Assomption River. Amerindians had already been visiting this site since ancient times and called it Outaragasipi meaning winding river, in reference to the river's course. They would drag their canoes across the peninsula as a short-cut for the meander, and therefore the settlement was first called Le Portage.

In 1717, the parish was formed, known thereafter as Saint-Pierre-du-Portage-de-l'Assomption and also as Saint-Pierre-et-Saint-Paul-du-Portage. In 1766, the village saw an influx of Acadian settlers. Between 1774 and 1888, L'Assomption was the most prosperous and important town between Montreal and Trois-Rivieres.

In 1845, the L'Assomption Municipality was established, abolished in 1847, but reestablished as a parish municipality in 1855. In 1846, the village itself became a separate Village Municipality and obtained town status in 1888.

In 1992, the town and parish municipality were merged again, and on July 1, 2000, the neighbouring Parish Municipality of Saint-Gérard-Majella was amalgamated with Ville de L'Assomption.

In December 2010, the 1,300-worker Electrolux factory announced that it would close, relocating to Memphis, Tennessee.

Demographics 

Communities
Domaine-Beaudoin-Papin
Domaine-des-Fleurs
L'Assomption
Saint-Gérard-Majella

Education

The Sir Wilfrid Laurier School Board operates anglophone public schools, including:
 Joliette Elementary School in Saint-Charles-Borromée
The Commission scolaire des Affluents is the main school board in the region. It operates many francophone public schools, both at the elementary and high school levels, including:

 Paul-Arseneau High School in l'Assomption
 Armand-Corbeil High School in Terrebonne
 Jean-Baptiste Meilleur High School in Repentigny
 Point-du-Jour Elementary School in l'Assomption

The city is also home to the Collège de L'Assomption, a private High School of historical renown, as well as the Cégep Régional de Lanaudière in l'Assomption.

See also
 List of cities in Quebec

References

Cities and towns in Quebec
Incorporated places in Lanaudière
Greater Montreal
1647 establishments in the French colonial empire